Ram Gopal (born 1925) is an Indian writer and historian.

Life
His biography of Lokmanya Tilak was considered by the press as 'an admirable history and authoritative and standard work'. Reviewing it The Times said: "it is extremely well done". His Indian Muslims – A Political History (1858–1947) also brought him high praises. Rushbrook Williams said reviewing it in International Affairs: "The author has taken the greatest possible pains to maintain impartiality, and his book is the product of much industrious research and is exceedingly well written".

He was also author of several books on civics and politics. For some time he did research for the Union Ministry of Education in the Board of the History of the Indian Freedom Movement.

He was arrested in connection with the (August 1942) "Quit India" Movement and detained in Lucknow Central Jail.
He worked in editorial position in prominent English language newspaper published from allahbad in UP during his initial career.
He was Member of Uttar Pradesh Legislative council .

Works

English
 Lokmanya Tilak—A Biography
 Indian Muslims—A political Study (1858–1947)
 British Rule in India—An Assessment, Asia Publishing House, 1983
 Trails of Nehru
 How the British Occupied Bengal
 Linguistic Affairs of India
 Indo-Pakistan War and Peace
 How India Struggled for Freedom
 Man and Reason
 Spotlight on Democracy in India, Pustak Kendra, 1970
 India Under Indra
 Eight Leading Lights
 Indian Freedom Rhetorics & Realities

https://catalog.loc.gov/vwebv/holdingsInfo?searchId=1757&recCount=25&recPointer=0&bibId=755993
https://catalog.loc.gov/vwebv/holdingsInfo?searchId=1788&recCount=25&recPointer=6&bibId=560577Indian ( Muslims, a political history, 1858-1947)
https://catalog.loc.gov/vwebv/holdingsInfo?searchId=1757&recCount=25&recPointer=0&bibId=755993
(Linguistic affairs of India)
https://catalog.loc.gov/vwebv/holdingsInfo?searchId=1839&recCount=25&recPointer=20&bibId=1698310 (Lokamanya Tilak: a biography)
https://catalog.loc.gov/vwebv/holdingsInfo?searchId=1972&recCount=25&recPointer=87&bibId=8937110 (Svatantratā-pūrva Hindī ke saṅgharsha kā itihāsa)
https://catalog.loc.gov/vwebv/holdingsInfo?searchId=1972&recCount=25&recPointer=89&bibId=8478868 (Man and reason)
https://catalog.loc.gov/vwebv/holdingsInfo?searchId=1972&recCount=25&recPointer=90&bibId=8451345 (How the British occupied Bengal; a corrected account of the 1756-1765 events)

Hindi
 Bhartiya Raajneeti Victoriya se Nehru Tak
 Hindi ke sangharsh (Svatantratā-pūrva Hindī ke saṅgharsha kā itihāsa)https://catalog.loc.gov/vwebv/holdingsInfo?searchId=1972&recCount=25&recPointer=87&bibId=8937110
 Tapaswani

References

20th-century Indian historians
1925 births
Living people
English-language writers from India
Indian political writers
Quit India Movement
20th-century Indian biographers